Where Dream and Day Collide is an EP by Norwegian metal band Madder Mortem, released on 10 May 2010 on Peaceville Records. The EP contains three brand new songs, along with the single and album versions of the title track, taken from the 2009 release Eight Ways.

Track listing

Personnel 
Madder Mortem
Agnete M. Kirkevaag – lead vocals
BP M. Kirkevaag – guitars, backing vocals
Odd E. Ebbesen – guitars
Tormod L. Moseng – bass guitar, double bass
Mads Solås – drums

Production
Produced by BP M. Kirkevaag and Madder Mortem
Engineered by BP M. Kirkevaag
Mixed by BP M. Kirkevaag
Mastering by Peter In de Betou

References 

Madder Mortem albums
2010 EPs